Cashville is an unincorporated community in Spartanburg County, in the U.S. state of South Carolina.

History
Cashville once contained a sawmill and cotton gin. The Cashville post office closed in 1901.

References

Unincorporated communities in Spartanburg County, South Carolina
Unincorporated communities in South Carolina